Kutllovc (in Albanian) or Kutlovac  (in Serbian:Кутловац) is a village in the municipality of Mitrovica in the District of Mitrovica, Kosovo. According to the 2011 census, it has 473 inhabitants.

Demography 
In 2011 census, the village had in total 473 inhabitants, from whom 473 (100 %) were Albanians.

Notes

References 

Villages in Mitrovica, Kosovo